Binu Sasidharan  (born 17 November 1976) is an Indian film maker known for his work in the Malayalam Film industry.

He made his debut feature film Once Upon a Time (2013 film) which is being touted as Malayalam’s first full-length animated feature film.  Binu,  has previously directed on an animated version of film CID Moosa  (CID Moosa 007 for home video) and more recently he was the maker of Malayalam’s first animated stereoscopic 3D video film  for home theaters named Kuttichathan.

Early life 
Binu was born in Desam, Aluva in Eranakulam Dist., Kerala. He completed his post graduation in commerce  from Sree Sankara College, Kalady  1999.

Career 
In 1999 after his studies, Binu started his career as a freelance designer and animator. In 2002 for a short term he also worked as a Guest tutor (web), at Union Christian College, Aluva.
 In 2004 he joined USA based MNC as Graphic Designer and later in the year 2005 he started  own  animation studio Wireframe animation in his own home town and at the same time started working as independent Creative consultant. In his short career of around 14 years he has worked for various Films, Advertising and Television

Filmography
Once Upon a Time (2013)
CID Moosa 007
Kuttichathan

See also
Indian animation industry

References

1976 births
Living people
Malayalam film directors
Indian animators
Indian animated film directors
People from Aluva
Film directors from Kochi